Nationality words link to articles with information on the nation's poetry or literature (for instance, Irish or France).

Events
 April 18 — American poet Ezra Pound's indictment for treason is dismissed. He is released from St. Elizabeths Hospital, an insane asylum in Maryland, after spending 12 years there (starting in 1946) and returns to Italy.
 June 29 — A monument to Vladimir Mayakovsky is unveiled in the centre of Moscow and becomes a focus for informal poetry readings.
 Brazilian manifesto for concrete poetry, which focuses on visual and other sensory qualities.
 Writers Workshop, a Calcutta, India-based literary publisher, is founded this year by the poet P. Lal with several other writers.

Works published in English
Listed by nation where the work was first published and again by the poet's native land, if different; substantially revised works listed separately:

 Donald Hall et al., editors, New Poets of England and America
 David Cecil and Allen Tate, Modern Verse in English (anthology)

Canada
 Earle Birney, Selected Poems
 Louis Dudek:
 Laughing Stalks
 En Mexico
 John Glassco, The Deficit Made Flesh
 Ralph Gustafson, The Penguin Book of Canadian Verse
 Irving Layton, A Laughter in the Mind.
 E. J. Pratt, The Collected Poems of E. J. Pratt. Toronto: Macmillan. (introduction by Northrop Frye)
 James Reaney, A Suit of Nettles. Governor General's Award 1958.
 F. R. Scott and A.J.M. Smith, The Blasted Pine, a satirical miscellany
 A. J. M. Smith and F. R. Scott, editors, The Oxford Book of Canadian Verse (see also the edition of 1966)
 Raymond Souster, Crepe-Hanger's Carnival: Selected Poems 1955-58 Toronto: Contact Press.
 Miriam Waddington, The Season's Lovers

Criticism, scholarship and biography in Canada
 L.M. Lande, Old Lamps Aglow
 R.E. Rashley, Poetry in Canada

Ireland
 Thomas Kinsella, Another September, Dublin, Dolmen Press
 Patrick MacDonogh, One Landscape Still
 Donagh MacDonagh and Lennox Robinson editors, The Oxford Book of Irish Verse, XVIIth century-XXth century (anthology)

India, in English
 Sarojini Naidu, The Sceptred Flute—Songs of India ( Poetry in English ), Allahabad: Kitabistan, published posthumously (died 1949)
 Dilip Kumar Roy, The Immortals of the Bhagvat ( Poetry in English ),

United Kingdom
 A. Alvarez, The End of It
 John Betjeman, Collected Poems, London: John Murray; Boston, Houghton Mifflin, 1959
 Michael Hamburger, The Dual Site, London: Routledge and Kegan Paul
 John Heath-Stubbs, Helen in Egypt, and Other Plays
 Elizabeth Jennings, A Sense of the World
 George Rostrevor Hamilton, Collected Poems
 John Heath-Stubbs, The Triumph of the Muse
 Elizabeth Jennings, A Sense of the World, London: André Deutsch
 Thomas Kinsella, Another September Irish poet published in the United Kingdom
 Dom Moraes, A Beginning, his first book of poems (winner of the Hawthornden Prize), Indian at this time living in the United Kingdom
 James Reeves, The Talking Skull
 Michael Roberts, Collected Poems
 Alan Ross, To Whom It May Concern
 John Silkin, The Two Freedoms
 Sir Osbert Sitwell, On the Continent (see also England Reclaimed 1927 and Wrack at Tidesend 1952)
 John Smith, Excursus in Autumn, including "Two Men Meet, Each Believing the Other to be of a Higher Rank"
 A.S.J. Tessimond, Selection
 R.S. Thomas, Poetry for Supper
 C.A. Trypanis, a book of poetry
 David Wright, Monologue of a Deaf Man, London: André Deutsch

United States
 Conrad Aiken, Sheepfold Hill
 Djuna Barnes, The Antiphon a surrealist verse play
 John Berryman, His Thoughts Made Pockets & the Plane Buckt
 John Ciardi, I marry You; a Sheaf of Love Poems
 Gregory Corso:
 Gasoline
 Bomb
 Louis Coxe, The Wilderness and Other Poems
 E.E. Cummings, 95 Poems
 Lawrence Ferlinghetti, A Coney Island of the Mind, New Directions
 George Garrett, The Sleeping Gypsy
 Donald Hall, The Dark Houses
 Anthony Hecht, The Seven Deadly Sins
 John Hollander, A Crackling of Thorns, Yale University Press
 Rolfe Humphries, editor, New Poems by American Poets (anthology)
 Stanley Kunitz, Selected Poems: 1928–1958
 Denise Levertov, Overland to the Islands, Highlands, North Carolina: Jonathan Williams
 Archibald MacLeish, J.B., a verse play
 William Meredith, The Open Sea and Other Poems
 Howard Nemerov, Mirrors and Windows
 Kenneth Patchen:
 Poem-scapes
 Hurrah for Anything
 When We Were Here Together
 Theodore Roethke, Words for the Wind, Garden City, New York: Doubleday
 Muriel Rukeyser, Body of Waking
 Winfield Townley Scott, The Dark Sister
 Karl Shapiro, Poems of a Jew, New York: Random House
 Eli Siegel, Hot Afternoons Have Been in Montana: Poems nominated for the Pulitzer Prize for Poetry. 
 Clark Ashton Smith, Spells and Philtres
 William Jay Smith, Poems 1947-1957
 May Swenson, A Cage of Spines
 Charles Tomlinson, Seeing Is Believing, New York: McDowell, Obolensky
 John Updike, The Carpentered Hen and Other Tame Creatures
 Mona Van Duyn, Valentines to the Wide World
 David Wagoner, A Place to Stand
 William Carlos Williams, Paterson, Book V

Other in English
 James K. Baxter, In Fires of No Return, published by Oxford University Press, giving Baxter international recognition, New Zealand
 Peter Bland, Three Poets, New Zealand

Works published in other languages
Listed by language and often by nation where the work was first published and again by the poet's native land, if different; substantially revised works listed separately:

Spanish language

Chile
 Efraín Barqueto, La Compañera
 Alfonso Calderón, El Pais Jubiloso ("Jubilant Country")
 Vincente Huidobro, Ataigle, French translation
 Gabriela Mistral, Poesías completas, Madrid : Aguilar
 Pablo Neruda, Complete Works

Others from Latin America
 José Ramón, Antología poética, Argentina
 Rubén Vela, Veranos, Argentina

Spain
 Jorge Guillén:
 Viviendo
 Maremágnum
 Miguel de Unamuno, Cincuenta poesías inéditas (written 1899–1927, now published for the first time)

Portuguese language

Portugal
 Herberto Hélder, 
 Eugénio de Andrade, 
 Alexandre O'Neill, 
 Mário Cesariny,

French language

French Canada
 Ollivier Mercier-Gouin, Poèmes et Chansons
 Ronald Després, Silences à nourrir de sang
 Roger Brien, Vols et plongées
 Alain Grandbois, L'Étoile pourpre
 Roland Giguère, Le défaut des ruines est d'avoir des habitants

France
 Yves Bonnefoy, Hier régnant désert
 Pierre Emmanuel, Versant de l'âge
 Vincente Huidobro, Altaigle (translation from Spanish)
 Philippe Jaccottet, L'Ignorant
 Pierre Jean Jouve, Inventions
 Raymond Queneau:
 Le chien à la mandoline
 Cent mille milliards de poèmes
 Roger-Arnould Rivière, Déserts
 Georges Schéhadé, Ethiopiques

Hebrew
 Sh. Shalom:
 Ben Tehelet ve-Lavan ("Amidst the Blue and White")
 Shirai Kommiut Israel ("Poems on the Rise of Israel")
 Yehoshua Rabinow, Shirat Amitai ("Amitai's Song")
 I. Shalev, Eloha Hanoshek Lohamim
 P. Elad, Mizrah Shemesh ("East of the Sun")
 David Rokeah, Kearar Aleh Shaham ("Juniper on Granite")
 T. Carmi, ha-Yam ha-Aharon ("The Last Sea")
 Y. Amihai, be-Merhak Shtai Tikvot ("At a Distance of Two Hopes")
 Ephraim Lisitzky, Anshai Midot ("Virtuous Men")

India
Listed in alphabetical order by first name:
 Buddhidhari Singha, Madhumati, Maithili
 Nalini Bala Devi, Yuga-devata, Indian, Assamese-language
 Gopal Prasad Rimal, Yo Prem!  ("This Love"), Nepali
 K. S. Narasimha Swami, Silalate, Kannada

Other
 Dritëro Agolli, Në rrugë dolla ("I went out on the street") (Albania)
 Ko Un, Hyondae Munhak (South Korea)
 Meyer Shtiker, Yidishe landshaft ("Yiddish Landscape"), his second book of poems (Yiddish)
 Luo Fu, River of the Soul Chinese (Taiwan)

Awards and honors

United Kingdom
 Queen's Gold Medal for Poetry: Francis Cornford
 Foyle Prize for Poetry: Dame Edith Sitwell, Collected Poems
 Guinness Poetry Awards:
 Ted Hughes,  The Thought Fox
 Thomas Kinsella, Thinking of Mr. D
 David Wright, A Thanksgiving

United States
 Consultant in Poetry to the Library of Congress (later the post would be called "Poet Laureate Consultant in Poetry to the Library of Congress"): Robert Frost appointed this year.
 National Book Award for Poetry: Robert Penn Warren, Promises: Poems, 1954-1956
 Pulitzer Prize for Poetry: Stanley Kunitz, Selected Poems 1928-1958
 Bollingen Prize: E.E. Cummings
 Fellowship of the Academy of American Poets: Robinson Jeffers
 Harper's Eugene F. Saxton Fellowship; Conrad Hilberry
 Huntington Hartford Foundation Award: Robert Frost
 Jewish Book Council's Harry Kovner Memorial poetry awards: I.J. Schwartz for contributions to Yiddish poetry; Aaron Zeitlin for Bein Ha-Esh Yeha-Yesha
 Yale Series of Younger Poets award: William Dickey for Of the Festivity

American Academy of Arts and Letters
 American Academy of Arts and Letters Gold Medal in Poetry: Conrad Aiken
 Marjorie Peabody Waite Award: Dorothy Parker

Poetry Magazine
 Levinson prize: Stanley Kunitz
 Oscar Blumenthal prize: Siydney Goodsir Smith
 Eunice Tiejens prize: Mona Van Duyn
 Bess Hokin prize: Charles Tomlinson
 Union League Civic and Arts Foundation prize: Jean Garrigue
 Vachel Lindsay prize : Hayden Carruth
 Harriet Monroe Poetry Prize: Stanley Kunitz

Poetry Society of America
 Shelley Memorial Award: Kenneth Rexroth
 Alexander Droutzkoy Memorial gold medal: Robert Frost
 Walt Whitman Award: James E. Miller, Jr.
 Reynolds Lyric Award: John Fandel
 William Rose Benet Memorial Award: Robert A. Wallace
 Edna St. Vincent Millay Award: Robert Penn Warren
 Poetry Chap-Book Award: Arthur Waley
 Emily S. Hamblen Memorial award: Sir Geoffrey Keynes for The Complete Writings of William Blake
 Arthur Davison Ficke Memorial award: Ulrich Trobetzkoy
 Laura Speyer Memorial award: Mary A. Winter
 Borestone Mountain Poetry Award: John Hall Wheelock, Poems Old and New

France
 Grand Prix Littéraire de la Ville de Paris: Maurice Fonbeure for poetry
 Grand Prix de Poésie de l'Académie française: Mme. Gérard d'Houville

Other
 Mondadori, Viareggio poetry prize (Italy): S. Quasimodo, La terra impareggiabile
 Canada: Governor General's Award, poetry or drama: A Suit of Nettles, James Reaney

Births
Death years link to the corresponding "[year] in poetry" article:
 January 5 – Harold Rhenisch, Canadian poet
 April 15:
 Anne Michaels, Canadian poet and novelist
 Benjamin Zephaniah, British dub poet
 November 27 – Andrew Waterhouse (suicide 2001), English poet and environmentalist
 Also:
 Jill Battson, Canadian poet
 Lionel Fogarty, Australian poet and political activist
 James Lasdun, English poet and fiction writer
 Subodh Sarkar, Bengali poet, writer, editor and academic in India
 Margaret Smith, American poet, musician and artist

Deaths
Birth years link to the corresponding "[year] in poetry" article:
 January 3 – Gerald William Bullett, 64, English author and critic
 March 13 – Vallathol Narayana Menon (born 1878), Indian, Malayalam language poet
 March 24 – Seamus O'Sullivan (born 1879), Irish
 May 5 – James Branch Cabell, 79, whose 52 books included poetry, of a cerebral hemorrhage (to help people remember the pronunciation of his name, he composed the ditty, "Tell the rabble my name is CA-bell.")
 June 10 – Angelina Weld Grimke (born 1880), African American lesbian journalist and poet
 June 28 (disputed) – Alfred Noyes, English poet (born 1880) according to some sources, he died on June 25, but others, including Encyclopædia Britannica give June 28)
 September 11 – Robert W. Service, 84 (born 1874), Scots-Canadian poet who wrote The Cremation of Sam McGee
 October 29 – Zoë Akins, 72, American poet and dramatist who won the 1935 Pulitzer Prize for her drama version of Edith Wharton's The Old Maid
 November 12 – Masamune Atsuo 正宗敦夫 (born 1881), Japanese poet and academic
 December 20 – Sir John Collings Squire,  British poet, writer, historian and influential literary editor
 Also:
 Emil Barth (poet) (born 1900), German
 Francis Carco, French poet and novelist
 Yves Gérard le Dantec, French

See also

 Poetry
 List of poetry awards
 List of years in poetry

Notes

20th-century poetry
Poetry